The , signed as Route 4, is one of the routes of the Hanshin Expressway system serving the Keihanshin area. It is an intercity route that travels in a north to south direction from Osaka to Izumisano near Kansai International Airport.

See also

References

External links

Roads in Osaka Prefecture
4
1974 establishments in Japan